Cape Gordon is a jagged headland  high, forming the east end of Vega Island, lying south of the northeast tip of the Antarctic Peninsula. It was discovered by a British expedition 1839–43, under James Clark Ross, and named by him for Captain William Gordon, Royal Navy, a Lord Commissioner of the Admiralty.

References

Headlands of the Palmer Archipelago